Mecyna procillusalis is a moth in the family Crambidae. It was described by Francis Walker in 1859. It is found in South Africa.

References

Endemic moths of South Africa
Moths described in 1859
Spilomelinae
Moths of Africa